Set It Off is the first studio album released by Canadian Christian rock band Thousand Foot Krutch. The album features a fusion of heavy nu metal and softer rap rock songs, mixed with some pop punk influence. Some of the songs were from their independent album, That's What People Do. It was originally released on April 14, 2000. A remastered version of the disc, including six extra tracks, was issued on September 7, 2004. This is the last album to feature guitarist Dave Smith, who left the band in 2002 and the only album to feature drummer Geoff Laforet, who left the band in 2001.

Track listing

Personnel
 Trevor McNevan, credited as "Lipsick" - vocals and rhythm guitar: 
 Dave Smith, credited as "The Thing" - lead guitar
 Joel Bruyere, credited as "Cheetah" - bass and acoustic guitars
 Geoff Laforet, credited as "Johnny Orbital" - drums
 Thousand Foot Krutch - producer, mixing, mastering, art direction
 D.J. DOVE - executive producer, co-producer, mixing, turntables, art direction, A & R
 Bryan LeBrun - recording engineer at Desert Moon Recordings - Anaheim, California, mixing, mastering
 Andrew Horrocks - recording engineer at A.M.E. Studios - Ontario, Canada

 Additional Musicians
 Steve McCrumm - strings
 Ian Tanner - keyboards
 Christian Harvey - drums
 D.J. Circa - turntables
 Principal Media Group Studios - design and layout
 Doug Macklin - artwork
 Shane from Boomerang Photography - photography
 All songs written by: T. McNevan, D. Smith, J. Bruyere, J. LaForet.

Track listing (2004 version)

Tracks 6,10,11,13-18 are from Thousand Foot Krutch's independent release That's What People Do

Personnel (2004)
 Vocals and guitar: Trevor McNevan
 Bass guitar: Joel Bruyere
 Drums: Steve Augustine
 Track 1 Produced by: Gavin Brown and mixed by Scott Humphrey at The Chop Shop - Hollywood, California
 Tracks 2-13 Produced by: Thousand Foot Krutch
 2004 Remix by: JR McNeely at East Iris Studio - Nashville, Tennessee
 Tracks 14-18 Produced by: Thousand Foot Krutch with Andrew Horrocks at A.M.E. Studios - Kitchener, Ontario, Canada
 Mastered by: Troy Glessner at Spectre Mastering - Renton, Washington
 A & R: 'Brandon Ebel
 Art direction and design by: Asterik Studio - Seattle, Washington
 New band photography by: Kris McCaddon
 Archive band photography by: Miscellaneous
 All songs written by Trevor McNevan, Dave Smith, Joel Bruyere & Geoff Laforet © 2004 Thirsty Moon River Publishing (ASCAP), Teerawk Music Publishing (ASCAP/SOCAN), Pockethood Publishing (ASCAP/SOCAN), Spinning Audio Vortex (BMI) & Whatthewhat Music Publishing (BMI/SOCAN)
 (P) and © 2004 Tooth & Nail Records. Manufactured by Tooth & Nail Records, PO Box 12698, Seattle, WA 98111. Distributed in USA by EMI CMG Distribution. Tooth & Nail Reg. U.S. Pat. and TM Off. All rights reserved. Printed in USA.

Notes
 "Everyone Like Me" was recorded by the band in early 2004.
 [Untitled] on the original version and "Intro" on the 2004 version are the same song.
 "Rhime Animal", "Small Town", "Set It Off" and "Lift It" were remade for the 2004 version.
 Both "Supafly" and "Unbelievable" made it to the Top 5 on ChristianRock.Net. "Puppet" was a No. 1 at the same site.
 There is one music video for this album, for the song "Puppet". It features the band playing in an alley and also shows the shadows of two puppets against an orange sky, with one puppet chasing the other. Eventually the fleeing puppet escapes.

Awards

In 2005, the 2004 version of the album was nominated for a Dove Award for Rock Album of the Year at the 36th GMA Dove Awards.

References

Thousand Foot Krutch albums
2001 albums
Tooth & Nail Records albums